The deviancy amplification spiral and deviancy amplification are terms used by interactionist sociologist to refer to the way levels of deviance or crime can be increased by the societal reaction to deviance itself.

Origin of term
The process of deviancy amplification was first described by Leslie T. Wilkins.

Process
According to sociologist Stanley Cohen, the spiral starts with some deviant act. Usually the deviance is criminal, but it can also involve lawful acts considered morally repugnant by a large segment of society. With the new focus on the issue, hidden or borderline examples that would not themselves have been newsworthy are reported, confirming the pattern. This confirmation of the pattern was first documented by Stanley Cohen in Folk Devils and Moral Panic, a study of the media response to clashes between the Mods and Rockers, two rival subcultures of the time.

Reported cases of such deviance are often presented as the ones we know about, or the "tip of the iceberg, an assertion that is nearly impossible to disprove immediately. For a variety of reasons, the less sensational aspects of the spiraling story that would help the public keep a rational perspective (such as statistics showing that the behavior or event is actually less common or less harmful than generally believed) tend to be ignored by the press.

As a result, minor problems begin to look serious and rare events begin to seem common. Members of the public are motivated to keep informed on these events, leading to high readership for the stories, feeding the spiral. The resulting publicity has the potential to increase the deviant behavior by glamorizing it, or by making it seem common or acceptable. In the next stage, public concern typically forces the police and the law enforcement system to focus more resources on dealing with the specific deviancy than it warrants.

Judges and magistrates then come under public pressure to deal out harsher sentences and politicians pass new laws to increase their popularity by giving the impression that they are dealing with the perceived threat. The responses by those in authority tend to reinforce the public's fear, while the media continue to report police and other law enforcement activity, amplifying the spiral.

The theory does not contend that moral panics always include the deviancy amplification spiral.

Eileen Barker asserts that the controversy surrounding certain new religious movements can turn violent in a deviancy amplification spiral. In his autobiography, Lincoln Steffens details how news reporting can be used to create the impression of a crime wave where there is none, in the chapter "I Make a Crime Wave".

Button and Tunley have also presented a theory that offers the opposite to deviancy amplification, which they call deviancy attenuation. In this they argue using the case of fraud that there are some large problems, which those in positions of power are able to attenuate through not accurately measuring it, leading to statistics which underestimate the problem, leading to less resources dedicated to it, reinforcing the belief of those in power it is not a problem.

See also

Availability heuristic
Crowd psychology
Culture of fear
Folk devil
Love Jihad
Gel bracelet
Group sex
Jenkem
Junk food news
Knockout game
Mass hysteria
Mass media
Mean world syndrome
Missing white woman syndrome
Rainbow party
Representativeness heuristic
Sensationalism
Social control
Yellow journalism

References

Further reading 
 Cohen, Stanley. Folk devils and moral panics. London: Mac Gibbon and Kee, 1972. .
 Section 3.4 Interpreting the crime problem of Free OpenLearn LearningSpace Unit DD100_1 originally written for the Open University Course, DD100.
Button, Mark and Tunley, Martin. (2015) Explaining Fraud Deviancy Attenuation in the United Kingdom. Crime, Law and Social Change, 63: 49-64

Media studies
Social phenomena
Mass media issues
Deviance (sociology)
 
Criticism of journalism
News media manipulation
Media bias